Amyema preissii, commonly known as wireleaf mistletoe, is a species of mistletoe, an epiphytic, hemiparasitic plant of the family Loranthaceae.  It is native to Australia where it has been recorded from all mainland states.  The flowers are red and up to 26 mm long.  The fruits are white or pink, globose and 8–10 mm in diameter.  Its habitat is sclerophyll forest and woodland where it is often found on wattles.  On Victoria's Bellarine Peninsula its hosts include coast wirilda, golden wattle and drooping sheoak.  Its sticky seeds are eaten and dispersed by mistletoebirds.

References

preissii
Flora of New South Wales
Flora of the Northern Territory
Flora of Queensland
Flora of South Australia
Flora of Victoria (Australia)
Eudicots of Western Australia
Parasitic plants
Epiphytes
Plants described in 1895